Bisola Aiyeola  (born 21 January 1986) is a Nigerian actress and singer. In 2017, Bisola became the first runner up of Big Brother Naija. In 2018, she won the AMVCA Trailblazer Award at the 2018 Africa Magic Viewers Choice Awards. In 2021, she was one of the investors of Amaze, an app that makes endorsement deals easier for celebrities.

Education
Bisola attended National Open University of Nigeria where she studied business management.

Career
Aiyeola appeared on the 2017 series of Big Brother Naija where she was first runner up. While at BBN, she emerged winner of ONE Campaign reality show which is an international Advocacy Organisation for girl-child education with offices in London, United States, Nigeria and other parts of the world.

After leaving the house, as a singer, Bisola released her single debut Luchia under Temple music.

Bisola was one of the contestants at MTN Project Fame West Africa in 2008 where she came 5th and Iyanya won. From 2011 to 2013, Bisola was a one time TV host of Billboard Nigeria which aired on Silverbird Television.
In 2017, Bisola was nominated for City People Movie Award for Revelation of the Year (English) alongside Zainab Balogun, Somkele Iyamah, Seun Ajayi. In 2018, Bisola won the Trail Blazer Award at the AMVCA. She made her debut as a producer on Introducing the Kujus. In 2022, She became the first African to host family feud, A TV reality show organized by MTN and Ultima

Personal life
Aiyeola currently has a daughter. In August 2018, the father of Aiyeola's daughter died of an illness.

Selected filmography
Picture Perfect
Ovy's Voice (2017)
Skinny Girl in Transit
Gold Statue (2019)
The Bling Lagosians (2019)
Sugar Rush (2019 film)
The Becoming Of Obim (2019)
This Lady Called Life
Two Grannies And A Baby
Payday (2018 film)
Introducing The Kujus (2020)
Breaded Life (2021)
Dwindle (2021)
Castle and Castle (2021)
Chasing Rainbow's
Falz experience (2018)
Something Wicked (2017)
A Simple Lie (2022)
Makate must sell (2019)
Ben Quick
Chief daddy (2018)
Dinner at My Place (2022)
Let Karma (2018)
Husbands of Lagos (2015 TV series)
Flawsome (2022 TV series)
Palava (2022 film)

Awards and nominations

References

1986 births
Living people
Yoruba actresses
Participants in Nigerian reality television series
Nigerian film actresses
Nigerian television presenters
National Open University of Nigeria alumni
Nigerian film producers
Nigerian singers
Nigerian television personalities
AMVCA Trailblazer Award winners
21st-century Nigerian actresses
Big Brother (franchise) contestants